Carol Baum is an American movie producer best known for her work with Sandollar Productions, Dolly Parton's TV and film production company with Sandy Gallin, Parton's former manager. She is a member of the Academy of Motion Picture Arts and Sciences. She currently teaches producing at the USC School of Cinematic Arts, and formally taught a similar class at the American Film Institute (AFI). She also serves as a mentor for The Peter Stark Producing Program at USC.

Awards
In 1989, the documentary Common Threads: Stories from the Quilt won an Academy Award for Best Documentary Feature.
Also in 1989, Tidy Endings won a CableACE Award for Dramatic or Theatrical Special.
In 1997, Fly Away Home won a Christopher Award, a Genesis Award for Best Feature Film, and the Critic's Choice Award for Best Family Film at the Broadcast Film Critics Association Awards. In addition, Caleb Deschanel was nominated for an Academy Award for Best Cinematography for the film.
In 2015, Zapped won a Leo Award for Best Television Movie.

Personal life
A New Jersey native, Baum is a graduate of Columbia High School in South Orange, and New York University, where she majored in sociology.  She worked for Bantam Books and Random House in New York, as well as The Producers Circle, developing the movie adaptations of Ira Levin's The Stepford Wives, Stephen King's The Shining, and Ira Levin's The Boys from Brazil.  After moving to Los Angeles, she became a studio Vice President at Lorimar, where she developed Taylor Hackford's An Officer and a Gentleman, and then Vice President at Twentieth Century Fox, where she developed the Mike Nichols' movie, Working Girl.  She is the wife of writer Tom Baum and mother to Will Baum and writer Henry Baum and has three grandchildren. She lives in Los Angeles.

Filmography
She was a producer in all films unless otherwise noted.

Film

Television

References

External links
  

Living people
American Jews
American women film producers
American film producers
Year of birth missing (living people)
21st-century American women